Slavošov is a municipality and village in Kutná Hora District in the Central Bohemian Region of the Czech Republic. It has about 100 inhabitants.

Administrative parts
Villages of Hranice and Věžníkov are administrative parts of Slavošov.

Notable people
Jaroslav Stodola and Dana Stodolová (born 1966 and 1970), serial killers; lived here

References

Villages in Kutná Hora District